Vaset (also Romanized as Vāseţ) is a village in Mohammadabad Rural District, in the Central District of Zarand County, Kerman Province, Iran. At the 2006 census, its population was 817, in 186 families.

References 

Populated places in Zarand County